Scherenschnitte, which means "scissor cuts" in German, is the art of paper cutting design. The artwork often has rotational symmetry within the design, and common forms include silhouettes, valentines, and love letters. The art tradition was founded in Switzerland and Germany in the 16th century and was brought to Colonial America in the 18th century by Swiss and German immigrants who settled primarily in Pennsylvania.

See also 
 Papercutting
 Chinese paper cutting

Further reading
Gilpin, Sandra. "Scherenschnitte and Fraktur." Pennsylvania Folklife 37.4 (Summer 1988): 190–192.
Hopf, Claudia. Papercutting: Tips, Tools, and Techniques for Learning the Craft. Mechanicsburg, PA: Stackpole Books, 2007.
Lüscher, Ernst. Heraus Mit Der Schere. Bern: Verlag Paul Haupt, 1979.
Schaffer, Sharon A. "Scherenschnitte of the Pennsylvania Dutch." Pennsylvania Folklife 29.4 (1980): 14–16.
Schläpfer-Geiser, Susanne. Scherenschnitte: Designs and Techniques for the Traditional Craft of Papercutting. Asheville, NC: Lark Books, 1996.

External links

German art
Paper art